Leigh Loveday is a Welsh-born video game writer and designer. He is known for the unusual sense of humour with which he writes the material.

Career and work

Your Sinclair

Loveday began his career as letter-writer and reviewer in Your Sinclair magazine in the early 1990s. He was best remembered for his letters, which were not often focusing on video games material, rather being with humorous notes and titles like "Who buys Big Fun singles?" or "Star-Letter winning piece of doggerel". Loveday became somewhat infamous for letters, but he rose to prominence after submitting the "YS Complete Guide To Everything", which was a list of all games YS ever reviewed, with him making the list because he "was bored in Philosophy". However, the project did not make it to the intended issue of the magazine. Loveday also contributed to the YS2.

Rare
In 1994 Loveday began working for British developer Rare. During his years at the company he wrote the script to Donkey Kong Country 2, Banjo-Kazooie: Nuts & Bolts and Blast Corps, designed the manuals of most Rare games, and made the company's official site. On the site he also provided feedback to fans through the popular "Scribes" section, which employed his trademark sense of humor. While designing the site Loveday created its mascot Mr. Pants, who would have a cameo in a number of the company's games. Loveday also worked on the 2004 GBA game featuring Mr. Pants as its titular character. Loveday continues to provide feedback to fans through Rare's new site's "Mini-Scribes" section.

Other
Loveday is a regular on the retro games newsgroup comp.sys.sinclair. His reviews from Your Sinclair are available on the site Your Sinclair: The Rock'n Roll Years, which was created in to commemorate the magazine. He also reviews films at IMDb.

References

External links
Profile at Rare Witch Project
His entry at Rarepedia of MundoRare
The Lost 5 Lines from B-K: Nuts and Bolts by Leigh Loveday
List of Loveday's IMDb reviews

Video game writers
Living people
Welsh writers
Rare (company) people
Year of birth missing (living people)